Lawrence S. Ting Memorial School (LSTS), also known as Trường Đinh Thiện Lý (Dinh Thien Ly School) in Vietnamese, is a junior and senior high school located in Phu My Hung urban area, District 7, Ho Chi Minh City, Vietnam. Lawrence S. Ting Memorial School was established in honor of Lawrence Ting, the founder of CT&D Group of Taiwan.

LSTS is a non-for-profit school for the Vietnamese. LSTS has 7 grades (4 grades for junior high school and 3 grades for senior high school). The first academic year was 2008.
LSTS has a campus size of 2 hectares and is located right next to the Saigon South International School.  
In 2011, LSTS completed its second phase expansion with an addition of new buildings and facilities.
Overall LSTS is designed for a student body of 1200 students.  LSTS currently has an enrollment of over 1000 students. This school has been difficult to join in 2017.

In 2010, Microsoft Corporation has chosen LSTS as the first Microsoft Innovative School in Vietnam.  Faculty members of LSTS participate in Microsoft's Innovative School Partnership training programs at various locations around the world.
In a short span of time, LSTS has now become one of the top high schools in Ho Chi Minh City, Vietnam.

References

External links
Lawrence S. Ting Memorial School

Schools in Vietnam
High schools in Ho Chi Minh City
Educational institutions established in 2008
2008 establishments in Vietnam